Filippo Benedetto de Sio (30 November 1585 – 16 August 1651) was a Roman Catholic prelate who served as Bishop of Boiano (1641–1651) and Bishop of Caiazzo (1623–1641).

Biography
Filippo Benedetto de Sio was born in Cava, Italy and ordained a priest in the Order of Friars Minor Conventual. On 8 December 1623, he was appointed by Pope Urban VIII as Bishop of Caiazzo. On 31 December 1623, he was consecrated bishop by Denis-Simon de Marquemont, Archbishop of Lyon, with François Boyvin de Péricard, Bishop of Evreux, and Girolamo Tantucci, Bishop of Grosseto as co-consecrators. On 21 October 1641, he was appointed by Pope Urban VIII as Bishop of Boiano. He served as Bishop of Boiano until his death on 16 August 1651.

References

External links and additional sources
 (for Chronology of Bishops) 
 (for Chronology of Bishops)  
 (for Chronology of Bishops) 
 (for Chronology of Bishops) 

1585 births
1651 deaths
17th-century Italian Roman Catholic bishops
Bishops appointed by Pope Urban VIII
Franciscan bishops